The Nolza! tour was the debut concert tour by Korean group 2NE1. The tour supported their second extended play, 2NE1 (2011), and its Japanese version, Nolza. Members of Big Bang, Taeyang and GD & TOP, joined the tour as guest performers. An intended show in Bangkok, Thailand was cancelled due to flooding.

Background 
Two concerts were initially scheduled at the Olympic Hall in Seoul for August 27 and 28, 2011, with both shows being sold out instantly. 60,000 people were recorded applying for only 8,000 available seats, therefore a third concert was added for August 26. Interest was also huge for the Japanese leg of the tour, with up to 300,000 people reportedly applying for concert tickets. Due to the amount of interest in Japan, tour organizers considered adding an additional concert at the Tokyo Dome. 

A total 70,000 people attended the six concerts in Japan and all available seats were sold out on the same day of the general release on September 4. It was the largest debut concert tour by a Korean group at the time. The final show in Chiba at the Makuhari Messe (October 2) was attended by 12,000 people.

Set list
{{hidden
| headercss = background: #d9d9d9; font-size: 100%; width: 65%;
| contentcss = text-align: left; font-size: 100%; width: 75%;

| header = Setlist (Seoul, South Korea)
| content =
 "Fire"
 "Can't Nobody"
 "Let's Go Party"
 "I Don't Care"
 "Please Don't Go" (CL & Minzy)
 "Kiss" (Dara and CL)
 "You & I" (Bom solo)
 "Don't Cry" (Bom solo)
 "Just Look at Me" (Minzy solo)
 "It Hurts (Slow)"
 "Lonely"
 "In the Club"
 "Pretty Boy"
 "Don't Stop the Music"
 "Clap Your Hands"
 "Hate You"
 "I Am the Best"
 "Ugly"

Encore

 "Stay Together"
 "Go Away"
}}

Tour dates

Cancelled shows

Broadcasts and recordings

2NE1 1st Live Concert (Nolza!)

2NE1 1st Live Concert (Nolza!) is the first live album of South Korean girl group 2NE1. The album was released on November 23, 2011, by YG Entertainment.

The album was recorded during the group's headlining tour NOLZA which was held at the Olympic Hall at Olympic Park Korea in Seoul, South Korea from August 26–28, 2011.

Track listing

References

External links
 2NE1 official site

2011 concert tours
2NE1
Concert tours of Japan